Roberto Rambaudi (born 12 January 1966) is an Italian professional football coach and a former player, who played as a forward or midfielder in the position of right winger.

Club career
Rambaudi gained Serie A promotion with Foggia after winning the 1990–91 Serie B title, forming a notable attacking trio with Giuseppe Signori and Francesco Baiano, helping the team to a ninth-place finish in Serie A during the 1991–92 season under manager Zdeněk Zeman. He later moved to Atalanta during summer 1992, where he remained for two seasons. After the club were relegated in 1994, he moved to Lazio, alongside his former manager Zeman, where he put on notable performances, earning a call-up to the Italian national team. He later moved to Serie B sides Genoa, and later Treviso, before ending his career in 2000 in Serie B. Overall throughout his 16-year club career, he made 411 appearances, scoring 82 goals, between 1984 and 2000.

International career
Rambaudi also earned two caps for Italy in 1994 under manager Arrigo Sacchi, making his international debut in a 2–0 away victory over Estonia, in an UEFA Euro 1996 qualification match.

After retirement
After retiring, Rambaudi worked as a coach, firstly with the Lazio Youth squad from 2003, and later moving to coach Latina the following season, although he was sacked after only a few matches by Sciaretta. He signed a contract with Viterbese for the 2007–08 season, although he was unable to help the club avoid relegation.

He later worked as a football pundit for Dahlia TV, and subsequently Mediaset Premium.

On 3 March 2021, he was hired as head coach of Serie D club Flaminia. He left the club in October 2021 after a poor start to the season.

Honours
Foggia
 Serie B: 1990–91.

Lazio
 Coppa Italia: 1997–98.
 Supercoppa Italiana: 1998.

References

External links
 

1966 births
Living people
Association football midfielders
Italian footballers
Italy international footballers
Serie A players
Serie B players
Serie C players
F.C. Pavia players
A.C. Perugia Calcio players
Calcio Foggia 1920 players
Atalanta B.C. players
S.S. Lazio players
Genoa C.F.C. players
Treviso F.B.C. 1993 players
Italian football managers
A.S. Lodigiani managers
Serie D managers